The DuPont Show of the Week is an American television anthology drama series which aired for three seasons on NBC from September 17, 1961 to August 30, 1964. It was nominated one time for an Edgar Allan Poe Award and eight times for Primetime Emmy Awards.

Episode guide

Season 1

Season 2

Season 3

Notable Guest Stars
Entertainers who have appeared on The DuPont Show of the Week include:

Edie Adams
Dana Andrews
Lauren Bacall
Jack Benny
Milton Berle
Carol Burnett
Art Carney
Barbara Cook
Bing Crosby
Bob Cummings
Ruby Dee
Colleen Dewhurst
Marlene Dietrich
Douglas Fairbanks Jr
Peter Falk
Greer Garson
Lillian Gish
Merv Griffin
Gene Hackman
Bob Hope
Lena Horne
Danny Kaye
Frank Lovejoy
Walter Matthau
Lee Marvin
Harpo Marx
Ray Milland
John Mills
Merle Oberon
Dick Powell
Claude Rains
Debbie Reynolds
Cesar Romero
Maureen Stapleton
Rod Taylor
Danny Thomas
Tuesday Weld
Gene Wilder
Teresa Wright

See also
 The DuPont Show with June Allyson
 The DuPont Show of the Month

References

External links
 The DuPont Show of the Week at the Internet Movie Database
 The DuPont Show of the Week at CVTA A very complete history of the show

1961 American television series debuts
1964 American television series endings
1960s American anthology television series
Black-and-white American television shows
NBC original programming
1960s American drama television series
DuPont